The quoit brooch is a type of Anglo-Saxon brooch found from the 5th century and later during the Anglo-Saxon settlement of Britain that has given its name to the Quoit Brooch Style to embrace all types of Anglo-Saxon metalwork in the decorative style typical of the finest brooches.  The brooches take their modern name from the rings thrown in the game of quoits, and have the form of a broad ring, or circle with an empty centre, usually in bronze or silver (sometimes inlaid with silver or gold respectively), and often highly decorated. The forms are in a very low relief, so contrasting with other early Anglo-Saxon styles, with detail added by shallow engraving or punching within the main shapes. Dots or dashes are often used to represent fur on the animal forms, as well as lines emphasizing parts of the body.  They are fixed with a single, straight hinged pin like those of other Anglo-Saxon ring or Celtic brooches and are further defined by the presence of a slot and pin-stops on the ring.

Origins and context
Most scholars now agree that the style developed mainly from provincial late Roman metalwork styles, apparently drawing elements from both the relatively low-status jewellery found in military graves in northern Gaul and England such as belt buckles and fittings, and also late-Roman luxury work such as the style in one bracelet in the very late Roman Hoxne Hoard.  In the Quoit Brooch Style the very varied motifs are largely geometrical but include human face-masks and processions or confronted pairs of schematic animals.  In most pieces the motifs are tightly packed together in a way lacking classical harmony, but comparable to later Anglo-Saxon work. The style has also been related to late-Roman ring styles in finds such as the Thetford Hoard.

In late Roman Gaul and Britain cingula or belts decorated with metal fittings were worn as signs of rank by both soldiers and civilian officials.  One theory is that the style was produced by goldsmiths trained in late Roman provincial traditions working for Germanic clients, certainly after and perhaps also before the departure of the Roman legions and the end of Roman rule in Britain in 410 or thereabouts.  The style and forms are very different from contemporary continental Germanic ones, and the contexts of the various finds seem to allow for both the possibilities that Germanic owners were adopting some Romano-British cultural habits, and that Romano-British owners of objects were adopting partially Anglo-Saxon ones in the first years of the Anglo-Saxon settlement of Britain.

The discovery of an increasing number of important products of the Quoit Brooch ″school″ in northern France, however, shows that neither the style, nor the forms of jewellery are purely insular developments and that they cannot be linked with any particular ethnic group. An alternative theory has therefore been advanced that they are associated with broadly Germanic, mercenary or federate forces employed in the defence of both southern Britain and northern Gaul in the 5th century, who identified themselves and their status by the creation of innovative metalwork in late Roman tradition.

Finds
The Sarre Brooch, found in the Sarre Anglo-Saxon cemetery at Sarre, Kent in 1863, and now in the British Museum is the best-known example, in a very good state of preservation.  It was described by Gale Owen-Crocker as the "most magnificent example" of the Quoit brooch style.  Two three-dimensional doves sit on the flat circle of the brooch, and another on the head of the pin. In silver with the two zones of animal ornament gilded, it is 7.71 cm across.  It was bought by the British Museum in 1893, having once been in the museum of Henry Durden of Blandford.  This and a brooch from Howletts, Grave 13 are so similar that they are thought to be from the same workshop, if not the same artist, although several workshops are thought to have worked in the Quoit Brooch Style.

The brooches, the belt-fittings and the style, are mainly found in high-status burials in southern-eastern England, south of the Thames, and right across northern France, dating from the middle quarters of the 5th century. The British Museum also has a fragment of a brooch similar to the Sarre one from Howletts, Kent, and several belt-fittings in the style from the Anglo-Saxon cemetery at Mucking in Essex, as well as pieces excavated at Chessell Down on the Isle of Wight and Howletts in Kent.  The brooch shape survived beyond that, but in a much plainer style.

Given its limited range in time and place, the style is rare, and one survey in 2000 identified only 5 round brooches (counting style of decoration rather than shape) and a maximum of 39 objects in the style, though the total must be revised upwards in light of the French evidence and in the same year Peter Inker described and illustrated 7 round brooches.   One significant addition to the corpus was found near Winchester in 2013 and registered by the Portable Antiquities Scheme.  This was a "large fragment of a 5th century copper alloy scabbard mount with silver inlay" with a crouching animal, and part of its confronted partner, projecting above a zone with geometric rosettes to form the upper edge of the scabbard.

Debate
The style was identified in the 20th century and initially provoked much debate as to its origins.  It is often connected with the Jutes, who Bede said settled in the core area of the finds, and "barbarian" continental influences, Germanic and Frankish are often also seen in the style, which has also been called "Jutish Style A" by Sonia Hawkes.

Notes

References
Ager, Barry M., ″The smaller variants of the Anglo-Saxon quoit brooch″, Anglo-Saxon Studies in Archaeology and History Vol. 4, 1985, pp. 1–58
Ager, Barry M., ″A note on the objects decorated in the Quoit Brooch Style from the burials at Saint-Marcel″, pp. 240–242 in F. Le Boulanger and L. Simon, ″De la ferme antique à la nécropole de l′Antiquité tardive (milieu du IIe s. – fin du Ve s. apr. J.-C.). Étude archéologique du site de Saint-Marcel «le Bourg» (Morbihan)′, Gallia, Vol. 69.1, 2012, pp. 167–307
Böhme, Horst W., ″Das Ende der Römerherrschaft in Britannien und die angelsächsische Besiedlung Englands im 5. Jahrhundert″, Jahrbuch des Römisch-Germanischen Zentralmuseums Mainz, Vol. 33, 1986, pp. 469–574
Hawkes, Sonia, "Some Recent Finds of Late Roman Buckles", p. 390, Britannia, Vol. 5, (1974), pp. 386–393, Society for the Promotion of Roman Studies, 
Inker, Peter, "Technology as Active Material Culture: The Quoit-brooch style", Medieval Archaeology Vol. 44, 2000, pp. 25–52 PDF, with good drawings of most objects in the style
Owen-Crocker, Gale R., review of The Quoit Brooch Style and Anglo-Saxon Settlement: A Casting and Recasting of Cultural Identity Symbols by Seiichi Suzuki, Speculum, Vol. 77, No. 4 (Oct., 2002), pp. 1401–1403, Medieval Academy of America, Article , 
Russell, Miles and Laycock, Stuart, UnRoman Britain. Exposing the great myth of Britannia, 2010, The History Press, Stroud
Smith, Reginald A., "Jutish Finds in Kent", The British Museum Quarterly, Vol. 10, No. 3 (Mar., 1936), pp. 131–132, . 
Soulat, Jean (2nd ed.), ″Le Matériel Arquéologique de type Saxon et Anglo-Saxon en Gaule Mérovingienne″, Mémoires de l'Association Française d′Archéologie Mérovingienne, Vol. 20, 2012, 
Suzuki, Seiichi, The Quoit Brooch Style and Anglo-Saxon England, 2000, Boydell Press, Woodbridge, 
Webster, Leslie, Anglo-Saxon Art, 2012, British Museum Press, 

Brooches
Anglo-Saxon art
5th century in England